Officially called the Naval Force of Pennsylvania.

In April 1889, the Pennsylvania Navy was reconstituted as the Naval Force of Pennsylvania (or Pennsylvania Naval Militia) - one of many organized state naval militias which were the predecessors to the modern day Naval Reserve. 

By 1894, Pennsylvania was one of many states using ships lent by the regular navy.  It was organized on a battalion level. 

Ships that served with this militia until the creation of the Naval Reserve included the protected cruiser  which served from 26 April 1916 to April 1917 and the ironclad  which served for 11 years making summer training cruises for the Naval Reserve.

References

External links
Pennsylvania State Navy website

History of the United States Navy
Pennsylvania Navy Z
Disbanded navies